The Chitrakote Falls (also spelled Chitrakote, Chitrakot, and Chitrakoot) is a natural waterfall on the Indravati River, located approximately  to the west of Jagdalpur, in Bastar district in the Indian state of Chhattisgarh.

It is the widest waterfall in India, reaching a width of nearly  during the monsoon season. Because of its width and its widespread horseshoe shape during the monsoon season, it is often called the "Niagara Falls of India".

Topography

The Chitrakote Falls is located on the Indravati River. The river originates in the Kalahandi district of Odisha, in the Vindhya Range of hills, flows westward, and then forms a fall at Chitrakote, after which it finally flows into the Godavari River at Bhadrakali, after traversing  in the state.
Because of its horseshoe shape, it is often compared with the world-famous Niagara Falls in the United States, and is given the sobriquet "the Small Niagara Falls". During the rainy season, from July to October, rainbows are created with sun rays reflecting on mist from the waterfall.

A small Hindu shrine dedicated to the god Shiva and several naturally created grottoes named "Parvati caves" (named after Shiva's wife Parvati) are located on the left bank of the Chitrakote Falls. The river flows sluggishly on the upstream side of the falls due to its meandering nature as it drains through the plains of Jagdalpur. This reach of the river valley has very little forest cover. Below the falls the river traverses the Bodhghat forested area and the river regime undergoes a drastic change in its flow conditions. Aeration processes and the forest in the downstream area filter the silt in the river. The weather in the area is generally pleasant except in the summer season when it is hot due to the absence of shade from vegetation in the area.

Chitrakote Falls is one of two waterfalls located near the Kanger Valley National Park, the other being Teerathgarh Falls.

Geology

The geological formation of the Indravati River valley as it rises and flows downstream consists of quartzitic sandstone and changes to the Archaean granite and gneisses near the Chitrakote Falls. It is one of the six waterfalls in India classified as "geomorphosites" (geoheritage sites with geomorphological interest); this classification is based on research studies of geological features of heritage value existing in different parts of the country. These have been studied and discussed in seminars by geologists, and studies have received the support of international institutions such as the United Nations Educational, Scientific and Cultural Organization (UNESCO), the International Union for Conservation of Nature (IUCN), the International Union of Geological Sciences (IUGS), and the International Association of Geomorphologists (IAG).

Features

Though it is about one-third less in width compared to Niagara Falls, its visual splendour has been described as equally impressive. Water flow conditions over the falls vary with the seasons. During the flood season or the monsoon season, the flow is filled with silt. It is India's widest waterfall.

Local boat facilities operating below and under the falls in a misty atmosphere provide views of the falls under an early morning sun in reflected sunlight and in a blue hue. On the banks of the pond below the falls, many small Shiva Lingas (aniconic symbols of the god Shiva) are found in several niches, as are iron trishuls (the trident weapon of Shiva), mostly in a rusted state. On the left bank, there is a rock ledge and climbing down this cliff leads to a naturally formed niche which houses stone slabs carved with deities. In addition, there is a small hut made of straw where Shiva images and rusted images of his son, the god Ganesha, are seen. Many local people are involved in fishing in the area.

The beauty of the falls can be seen throughout the year, particularly during sunset. As the fast-flowing water of the river flows over the sharp, near-vertical rock exposure at the widest reach of the river, it generates misty clouds and then hits into a pond formed in a semicircular shape at the bottom of the falls. Adventure sports enthusiasts use boats in the stormy part of this pond. Pilgrims bathe in the calmer part of the lake. In the low-flow season, paddle boats are used in pools formed in the upstream part of the falls. In the pool below the falls, swimming and paddle boats are permitted. Local boatmen can paddle their boats under the spray below the falls.

Some terrorist activity by Maoists (anti-revisionist) has been reported in the area. In 2008, when then-President of India Pratibha Patil visited Chitrakote Falls, there was a violent attack on a police vehicle which was blown up.

Conservation
The Ministry of Tourism and Development of the Government of India assessed the potential of this site in 2003 as being of a natural "ambiance" suitable for the development of ecotourism. Based on this assessment, plans were drawn up to develop facilities such as local restaurants, nature camping sites, a playground for children, and platforms from which to view the falls, and also to improve the road conditions, fix signs along the road from Jagdalpur to the falls, and generally beautify the site. Environmental conditions in the vicinity of the falls are in a largely preserved state but need attention as ecotourism develops.

As of 2010, some infrastructure facilities had improved. There is a government-run hotel at the top of the falls. A series of steps from the garden of the hotel leads to the falls. "Chitrakote log huts" with basic and modern cabins have also been built at the location. Some of the cabins provide good views of the falls. The falls dried up during the summer, from April to June, because water of the Indravati River has been diverted through Jaura Nallah near the Odisha–Chhattisgarh border by the Odisha government. It also includes indiscriminate construction of check dams near the falls. Social activists and environmentalists are making efforts to restore its charms. At present the falls is worth seeing during the rain only.

Apart from many large hydroelectric power plants on the Indravati River, a small power plant of 7.5 MW capacity has been planned to utilize the head at the Chitrakote Falls, though no irrigation is envisaged.

See also
List of waterfalls in India
List of waterfalls in India by height
Kanger Ghati National Park
Tamda Ghumar
Teerathgarh Falls
Kotumsar Cave
Mendri Ghumar
Jagdalpur

References

Bibliography

External links

Chitrkote Water Fall, Jagdalpur, Bastar) YouTube
Chitrakoot falls
Chitrakoot Waterfalls - The Indian Niagara

Waterfalls of Chhattisgarh
Tourist attractions in Chhattisgarh
Bastar district
Waterfalls of India